Chilo erianthalis is a moth in the family Crambidae. It was described by Hahn William Capps in 1963. It is found in North America, where it has been recorded from Georgia, Florida and South Carolina. It is also found in the West Indies.

The larvae feed on Saccharum species and probably other Gramineae species.

References

Chiloini
Moths described in 1963